O Corpo is a 1991 Brazilian comedy film directed by José Antônio de Barros Garcia, based on the adaptation of Clarice Lispector's homonymous tale. It stars Antônio Fagundes, Marieta Severo, Cláudia Jimenez and Carla Camurati.

Cast 
Antônio Fagundes… Xavier
Marieta Severo… Carmem
Cláudia Jimenez… Beatriz (Bia)
Sérgio Mamberti… delegado
Carla Camurati… Monique
Maria Alice Vergueiro… delegate's wife
Arrigo Barnabé
Guilherme de Almeida Prado
Daniel Filho
Carlos Reichenbach

Awards 
1991: Festival de Brasília (Brasília Festival of Brazilian Cinema) 1991
Best Film (won)
Best Actress (Marieta Severo and Cláudia Jimenez) (won)
Best Screenplay (Alfredo Oroz) (won) 
Best Art Direction (Felipe Crescenti) (won) 
Best Music (Paulo Barnabé) (won)
Best Editing (Danilo Tadeu and Eder Mazzini) (won)

1993: Cartagena Film Festival
Best Film (won)
Best Actor (Antônio Fagundes) (won)
Best Screenplay (José Antonio Garcia and Alfredo Oroz) (won)

1997: São Paulo Association of Art Critics Awards
Best Actress (Marieta Severo) (won) 
Best Screenplay (José Antonio Garcia and Alfredo Oroz) (won)

References

External links 
 

1991 films
1990s Portuguese-language films
Brazilian romantic comedy films
Films based on works by Clarice Lispector
Films about threesomes